Jiri Hlinka (born 1944) is a Norwegian professor and piano  teacher of Czech origin. His most well-known student is Leif Ove Andsnes.

Career
Hlinka was born in Prague, Protectorate of Bohemia and Moravia, and was a student of Frantisek Rauch and Joseph Paleniček at the Prague Academy of Music. He started giving concerts in 1966 and reached the finals of the International Tchaikovsky Competition in Moscow the same year. He recorded Sergei Prokofiev's piano sonatas 2 and 6 for Supraphon in 1967. The album was released in Norway in 1998.

In 1970, he was forced to give up his soloist career for medical reasons and has since worked as a piano pedagogue. In 1972, he moved to Norway, obtaining  Norwegian citizenship in 1982. He has taught at conservatories in Bergen and Oslo and regularly gives international master classes. Among his students are Leif Ove Andsnes, Håvard Gimse and Geir Botnen.

Awards
Hlinka was awarded the Lindeman Prize in 1992 and the Grieg Prize in 1995. In 2004, he was awarded the King's Medal of Merit in gold and in 2007 the Czech Gratias agitMerit for presenting Czech culture abroad. He was a Government scholar from 1995 to 2011.

References

External links
Jiri Hlinka - biographical information in Norwegian.

1944 births
Living people
Academic staff of the University of Bergen
Recipients of the King's Medal of Merit in gold
Czech classical pianists
Musicians from Prague
Academic staff of the Barratt Due Institute of Music
Czech emigrants to Norway
21st-century classical pianists